Fahad Fussad Mohamed (born 21 March 2000) is a footballer who last played as a midfielder for AB. Born in Finland, he is a Somalia international.

Career
Mohamed started his career with Finnish side Atlantis FC. Before the 2022 season, he signed for AB in the Faroe Islands.

References

External links
 

Living people
2000 births
Finnish people of Somali descent
Somalian footballers
Finnish footballers
Association football midfielders
Somalia international footballers
Kakkonen players
Faroe Islands Premier League players
Atlantis FC players
Argja Bóltfelag players
Somalian expatriate footballers
Finnish expatriate footballers
Somalian expatriate sportspeople in the Faroe Islands
Finnish expatriate sportspeople in the Faroe Islands
Expatriate footballers in the Faroe Islands